Sixto Pondal Ríos (April 8, 1907 - September 29, 1968) was an Argentine screenwriter, poet and dramatist.

Rios was born in San Miguel de Tucumán, Argentina.  Although most of his film work took place in Argentina, the 1948 film Romance on the High Seas was based on his story (with Carlos Olivari) and is notable as Doris Day's first film role.  He died in Buenos Aires, aged 61.

Selected filmography
 El mejor papá del mundo (1941)
 Los martes, orquídeas (1941)
 Persona honrada se necesita (1941)
 You Were Never Lovelier (1942)
 The Journey (1942)
 Two Angels and a Sinner (1945)
The Maharaja's Diamond (1946)
Cristina (1946)
 The Private Life of Mark Antony and Cleopatra (1947)
Five Faces of Woman (1947)
 Musical Romance (1947)
 Romance on the High Seas (1948)
 Pasó en mi barrio (1951)
 The Seducer of Granada (1953)
 Sugar Harvest (1958) (producer)
 Behind a Long Wall (1958)

See also
Lists of Argentine films

External links

Male screenwriters
20th-century Argentine poets
20th-century Argentine male writers
Argentine male poets
Argentine dramatists and playwrights
1907 births
1968 deaths
People from Tucumán Province
20th-century dramatists and playwrights
Male dramatists and playwrights
20th-century Argentine screenwriters